Maurice Amédée Louis Biais (shortened as Maurice Biais) (30 December 1872 – 8 April 1926) was a French painter, draughtsman and illustrator.

Biography 

From 1899, he designs furniture for La Maison Moderne, an art gallery founded by Julius Meier-Graefe. He designed leather goods for the shop, as well.

He married Jane Avril in 1911. They lived in Jouy-en-Josas until his death in 1926, which has been attributed to his having been gassed during World War I.

Works 

 Modern Style (1902)
 Les Five o'clock de Paulette Darty
 La Maison moderne (1902)
 Ville de Nîmes. Fêtes de charité 13, 14 et 16 février 1904 
 Scala (1901)
 Series for Saharet (1902)
 Jane Avril
 Erard Pianos
 Reuter's soap for the complexion and toilet 
 Quinquina Vouvray au vin blanc, apéritif exquis... 
 Palais de glace 
 Mephisto looping the loop 
 Lucy Florval (1901)
 Folies-Bergère. Ida Fuller (1901)
 Folies-Bergère. American' Sing' and Dancer'
 Comtesse de R... dans ses fantaisies japonaises (1908)
 Quinquina Vouvray au vin blanc, apéritif exquis, Ernest Bourin, Tours

References

External links

1872 births
1926 deaths
French illustrators
French poster artists
French male painters